Ni Yusong is a professional Chinese footballer who currently plays as a midfielder for Chinese Super League side Henan Jianye.

Club career
Ni Yusong started his career with Dalian Shide F.C. and was loaned out to their youth team called Dalian Shide Siwu FC who were allowed to take part in Singapore's 2008 S.League. Upon his return to Dalian Shide he would have to wait until the beginning of the 2011 Chinese Super League before he got his chance to make his debut for the team in a league game against Henan Jianye on May 21, 2011 in a 1-0 victory. At Dalian he would start to become a regular within the squad until at the end of the 2012 Chinese Super League season when the club admitted that they were in financial difficulties and the club was merged with local rivals Dalian Aerbin. Ni would leave to join another top tier club in Liaoning Whowin where he made his debut in a Chinese FA Cup game against Shenyang Shenbei on 22 March 2013 in a game that initially ended in a 1-1 draw, but was won in a penalty shoot-out. On 1 March 2019 Ni joined top tier club Henan Jianye.

Career statistics
.

References

External links
Player profile at Sodasoccer.com

1991 births
Living people
Chinese footballers
Footballers from Dalian
Dalian Shide F.C. players
Liaoning F.C. players
Henan Songshan Longmen F.C. players
Chinese Super League players
China League One players
Association football midfielders